Mission to the World (MTW) is the mission-sending agency for the Presbyterian Church in America. This evangelical Christian organization believes in advancing the Great Commission by promoting Reformed and covenantal church planting movements using word and deed in strategic areas worldwide.

Mission to the World has missionaries or international partners serving in 100 countries around the world. This includes 570 career missionaries, 71 short-term missionaries, 70 volunteer interns, and 1026 trip participants.

Dr. Paul Kooistra served as the coordinator from 1994 to 2014.

On July 24, 2014 Dr. Lloyd Kim was appointed as the new coordinator.

Locations 

MTW missionaries serve all over the world, including the following locations:

Africa
Ethiopia, Malawi, South Africa, Uganda, Zimbabwe

Asia-Pacific
Australia, Cambodia, Japan, New Zealand and Pacific Islands, Taiwan, Thailand

Europe
Belgium, Bulgaria, England, France, Germany, Greece, Italy, Latvia, Netherlands, Norway, Poland, Romania, Scotland, Slovakia, Spain, Ukraine

The Americas
Belize, Bahamas, Canada (First Nations), Chile, Colombia,Dominican Republic, Ecuador, El Salvador, Haiti, Honduras, Mexico, Panama, Peru, United States (Native America)

Publications 

MTW publishes one regular periodical. Network magazine comes out twice yearly and includes articles and pictures of MTW's work around the world. In addition, there is a weekly MTW Online email that includes recent blog posts.

Headquarters 

The organization maintains headquarters in Lawrenceville, Georgia, a suburb of Atlanta. MTW also has smaller hub offices throughout the United States. The PCA ministry buildings in Lawrenceville are the location from which the ministries of the denomination are coordinated. These ministries are Administrative Committee, Committee on Discipleship Ministries, Geneva Benefits Group, Mission to North America, Mission to the World, PCA Foundation, and Reformed University Fellowship.

References

External links 

 

Presbyterian missionary societies
Christian missions
Presbyterian Church in America
Christian organizations established in 1973